Senni Marjaana Salminen (born 29 January 1996) is a Finnish athlete who competes in the triple jump.

Born in Helsinki, she competes for Imatra athletics club and is coached by former Olympian Matti Mononen.

Salminen gained her first international experience in 2015 when she took fifth place in the triple jump at the Junior European Championships in Eskilstuna with a jump of 12.98 m.
In 2017 she reached eleventh place with 13.01 m at the U23 European Championships in Bydgoszcz. In 2021 she finished seventh at the European Indoor Championships in Toruń with 14.14 m.

In 2020, Salminen became the Finnish champion in the long jump outdoors and in 2021 indoors. In addition, she was triple jump indoor champion in 2020 and 2021. Salminen jumped a new Finnish record of 14.51 m at the Paavo Nurmi Games in Turku usurping the 18 year old previous record of Heli Koivula Kruger by 12 cm. With that jump she became the leading European in the year so far and surpassed the minimum for qualification to the delayed 2020 Tokyo Olympic Games.

Competition record

References

1996 births
Living people
Finnish female triple jumpers
Athletes from Helsinki
Lesbian sportswomen
Finnish LGBT sportspeople
Olympic athletes of Finland
Athletes (track and field) at the 2020 Summer Olympics
LGBT track and field athletes